The  was a pre–World War II experimental submachine gun of Japanese origin chambered in the 8mm Nambu round.

History 
The Type 2 was a development of the earlier Type 1 submachine gun, designed in response to criticisms of the Type 1's awkward ergonomics. The Type 2 offered a more conventional magazine feed and stock, but wholly retained the Type 1's method of operation and was essentially the same gun in a different body. It was initially produced in the mid-1930s and was tested by the Imperial Japanese Army, but rejected. During World War II, an urgent demand for automatic infantry weapons saw the revival of several experimental weapon projects, including the Type 2 submachine gun. Blueprints of the weapon was sent to the Mukden Arsenal in Manchukuo in 1944 for use in development of cheap submachine guns. Instead, those blueprints were used by the Chinese communists to produce submachine guns to be used in the Chinese Civil War following the end of the war with Japan and communist control over Mukden. These weapons were operationally identical but chambered in .45 ACP rather than 8×22mm Nambu. The British and US armies studied examples of the earlier Japanese prototypes obtained in Singapore and Japan after the surrender of Japan.

Design details 
The Type 2 was a blowback-operated submachine gun that fired from a closed bolt. Much like the Type 1, the Type 2's return spring enveloped the barrel of the gun rather than behind the bolt. The front section of the receiver and barrel shroud would travel back with the bolt upon firing and be pushed back forward by the return spring. The barrel stayed stationary. The cocking handle was not located in a slotted groove but instead took the form of a protruding tab fixed to the left side of the receiver. Early pre-war prototypes of the Type 2 were built with the same pneumatic buffer device seen on the Type 1, which cushioned the action of the gun and acted as a bolt delay. The timing of the delay could be adjusted by changing the air pressure exerted by the buffer, thus lowering or increasing the fire rate to either 500 or 600 RPM, but the examples captured after the war showcased five buffer holes as settings.  This was done by turning a pressure valve located underneath the rear cap. The later wartime models omitted the air buffer feature in an attempt to cut the expensive production costs. The Type 2 typically issued with 30-round magazines, although it could also feed from the same 50-round magazines as the Type 1. Late-war examples of the Type 2 had bayonet fittings, a feature not present on the original production models. A spike bayonet was also designed for the gun but was not used on the production models. The finish of the late-war models was typically poor compared to the earlier pre-war prototypes.

See also
 List of submachine guns
 List of common World War II infantry weapons
 List of Japanese military equipment of World War II

References

Further reading
 Chris Bishop et al. The Complete Encyclopedia of Weapons of World War II. Brown Books, 1998.

8×22mm Nambu submachine guns
Submachine guns of Japan
Weapons and ammunition introduced in 1935
World War II infantry weapons of Japan
World War II submachine guns